H42 or H-42 may refer to:
 H-42 (Michigan county highway)
 Glaucoma
 , a Royal Navy A-class destroyer
 , a Royal Navy H-class submarine
 H-42, an H-class battleship proposal for Germany's Kriegsmarine during World War II